Charles Thomas Scrimshaw (3 April 1909 – 4 June 1973) was an English footballer who played in the Football League for Middlesbrough and Stoke City.

Career
Scrimshaw was born in Derby and began his career playing amateur football with Hebden Bridge before joining Stoke City in 1929 as a 20-year-old. He played a regular role in the club's reserve side in the Central League only appearing for the first team as a replacement for an injured player. In fact it took Scrimshaw six years before he forced his way into the starting eleven mainly due to long serving full back Bob McGrory becoming Stoke's manager. Scrimshaw was seen as his replacement and he played in all the club's 47 fixtures in the 1935–36 season and only missed one match in 1936–37.

However, Scrimshaw could not maintain his place in the side and it was decided that he should leave for regular football. He joined Middlesbrough in October 1938, but only managed nine appearances due to injury. World War II interrupted league football and during the war leagues Scrimshaw returned to play for Stoke. He also played eight games as a guest at Port Vale, and also guested for Portsmouth. After the war ended and league football resumed Scrimshaw did not continue his footballing career.

Career statistics
Source:

Honours
Stoke City
 Football League Second Division: 1932–33

References

Footballers from Derby
English footballers
Association football fullbacks
Stoke City F.C. players
Middlesbrough F.C. players
Port Vale F.C. wartime guest players
Stoke City F.C. wartime guest players
Portsmouth F.C. wartime guest players
English Football League players
1909 births
1973 deaths